Sunny is a name. It can be a given name, a surname, and a nickname, especially from names such as: Sunil, Sundeep, Sunita, Shams or Suraj. Notable people with the name include:

Given name or nickname
 Sunny Anderson (born 1975), American chef and personality
Sunny Ang (1939–1967), Singaporean law student and executed murderer
 Ramesh "Sunny" Balwani (born 1965), American businessman, former president and chief operating officer of Theranos indicted for fraud and conspiracy
 Sunny Bawra, Indian music director
 Sunny von Bülow (1932–2008), American heiress and socialite
 Sunny Chan (born 1967), Hong Kong television and film actor
 Sunny Deol (born 1956), Bollywood actor
 Sunny Fong (born 1977), Canadian fashion designer
 Sunny Franco (born 1997), Australian soccer player
 Sunny Golloway, American collegiate baseball coach
 Sunny Hostin (born 1968), American lawyer, journalist, and television host
 Sunny Hundal (born 1977), British journalist, blogger and academic
 Sunny Jain, American dhol player, drummer, and composer
 Sunny Johnson (1953–1984), American actress 
 Sunny Joseph (born 1957), Indian cinematographer and director
 Sunny Ekeh Kingsley (born 1981), Nigerian footballer
 Sunny Lane (born 1980), American adult film star
 Sunny Lax (born 1986), Hungarian trance music producer
 Sunny Leone (born 1981), American-Canadian model and actress, and former adult film star
 Sunny Mabrey (born 1975), American actress and model
 Sunny Mehta (born 1978), American poker player, writer, and analyst
 Sunny Murray (born 1936), American jazz drumming pioneer
 Sunny Nijar (born 1988), Indian film and television actor
 Sunny Omoregie (born 1989), Nigerian footballer
 Sunny Singh (disambiguation), several people
 Sunny Skylar (1913–2009), American composer, singer, lyricist, and music publisher
 Sunny Sohal (born 1987), Indian cricketer
 Stephen Sunday (born 1988), Nigerian professional footballer nicknamed Sunny
 Sunny Suwanmethanont (born 1981), Thai actor
 Sunny Besen Thrasher (born 1976), Canadian actor
 Sunny Varkey (born 1957), Dubai-based Indian education entrepreneur and philanthropist
 Sunny Wayne, Indian film actor in Malayalam cinema

Stage or ring name
 Heather Wheatman, Indian-born British pop singer with stage name Sunny Leslie
 Lee Soon-kyu (born 1989), South Korean singer with stage name Sunny
 Tammy Lynn Sytch (born 1972), American professional wrestling personality with stage name Sunny
 Patricia Summerland, professional wrestler with stage name Sunny

Surname
Arafat Sunny (born 1986), Bangladeshi cricketer
 Elias Sunny (born 1986), Bangladeshi cricketer
 Hassan Sunny (born 1984), Singaporean footballer 
 K. P. A. C. Sunny (1934–2006), Indian actor in Malayalam movies
 Tehmina Sunny (born 1980), English actress

Fictional characters
 Sunny, a fictional prostitute in J.D. Salinger's The Catcher in the Rye
 Sunny, the title character of the animated television series Sunny Day
 Sunny or Kim Sun, a supporting character in K-drama Goblin: The Lonely and Great God by Kim Eun-sook
 Sunny Baudelaire, in the Series of Unfortunate Events books by Lemony Snicket
 Sunny Carstairs, played by Courtney Thorne-Smith in the 1987 American comedy movie Revenge of the Nerds II: Nerds in Paradise
 Sunny Lee, in the soap opera Neighbours
 Sunny (Metal Gear), in the Metal Gear series
 Sunny Milk, in the Touhou Project series
 SUNNY, the main character of the role-playing psychological horror game OMORI

See also
Sunny, nickname and given name